Diana Butler Bass (born February 19, 1959) is an American historian of Christianity and an advocate for progressive Christianity. She is the author of eleven books, many of which have won research or writing awards. 

Bass earned a PhD in religious studies from Duke University in 1991 with an emphasis on American ecclesiastical history, studying under George Marsden. From 1995 to 2000, she wrote a weekly column on religion and culture for the New York Times Syndicate that appeared in more than seventy newspapers nationwide, and has since become a popular commentator on American religion for other media outlets. She has blogged for the Sojourners God's Politics blog, On Faith at The Washington Post, Beliefnet, and The Huffington Post. As of this date, she authors the Substack newsletter The Cottage. 

Bass is associated with Sojourners, and with the Red-Letter Christian movement. As of this date, Bass is a member of the Episcopal Church.

Early life and education
Diana Butler Bass was born Diana Butler Hochstedt on February 19, 1959, in Baltimore, Maryland. She grew up in Scottsdale, Arizona. Raised a United Methodist, she became an evangelical. She attended Westmont College, a Christian college in Santa Barbara, California, from which she received a Bachelor of Arts degree in 1981. 

Bass received a Master of Arts in Theological Studies degree in ecclesiastical history from Gordon–Conwell Theological Seminary in 1986. Studying under the supervision of George Marsden, she received a Doctor of Philosophy degree in religious studies from Duke University in 1991. Her doctoral thesis was titled Standing Against the Whirlwind: The Evangelical Party in the 19th Century Protestant Episcopal Church.

Career

Bass worked primarily as an academic for a decade before becoming an independent scholar. She began in 1991 as an assistant professor of religious studies at Westmont College, from which she was fired in 1995. She went on to serve as a history instructor at the University of California at Santa Barbara from 1995 to 1996, as a visiting assistant professor of religious studies at Macalester College from 1996 to 1997, and as an associate professor of religious studies at Rhodes College from 1997 to 2000. In 2002, the Lilly Endowment awarded Bass a major grant to support her research on mainline Protestant churches at Virginia Theological Seminary.

Scholarship and writings

Bass's books range from a study of nineteenth-century evangelicalism (Standing Against the Whirlwind: Evangelical Episcopalians in Nineteenth-Century America) to a contemporary ethnography of mainline Protestantism (Christianity for the Rest of Us: How the Neighborhood Church Is Transforming the Faith) to theological explorations of contemporary life (Grounded and Grateful) to a spiritual memoir (Strength for the Journey: A Pilgrimage of Faith in Community), the latter of which records her growing dissatisfaction with conservative evangelical religion. Throughout her work, she displays an interest in the role of religion in cultural and social change, and eschews programmatic spirituality and leadership in favor of encouraging Christians to seriously practice their faith as a way to reform American churches and political life.

Speaking appearances
In 2005, Bass appeared on Religion & Ethics Newsweekly on PBS, and was, along with Martin E. Marty, one of two scholars chosen to represent mainline Protestantism in  The Life of Meaning: Reflections on Faith, Doubt, and Repairing the World, a book edited by the show's host, Bob Abernethy. In 2015, she was one of the keynote speakers at the Parliament of the World's Religions, held in Salt Lake City. 

Bass has also preached at St. Paul's Cathedral in London, the Washington National Cathedral, The Riverside Church in New York City, and many other churches in the United States and Canada.

Awards and recognition

Two of her books, Strength for the Journey and Christianity for the Rest of Us, have been named among the best books of their respective years by Publishers Weekly. Christianity for the Rest of Us was named book of the year by the Academy of Parish Clergy. Standing Against the Whirlwind was awarded the Frank S. and Elizabeth D. Brewer Prize by the American Society of Church History. Grounded: Finding God in the World and Grateful: The Transformative Power of Giving Thanks won the Wilbur Award as the best nonfiction book of the year from the Religion Communicators Council in 2017 and 2019, respectively. Grounded was also named the Book of the Year by the Religion Newswriters Association in 2016. As well, Bass has received multiple Gold and Silver awards from Nautilus Book Awards and Illuminations Book Awards.

Her work has been written about by USA Today, U.S. News & World Report, Newsweek, The Washington Post, the Los Angeles Times, and other papers, including the Pittsburgh Post-Gazette.

Personal life

Following her first marriage, she married Richard Bass on January 18, 1997, She is the mother of a daughter, Emma. Her sister-in-law, Dorothy C. Bass, is a theologian of Christian practice.

List of written works 
 Freeing Jesus: Rediscovering Jesus as Friend, Teacher, Savior, Lord, Way, and Presence. HarperCollins. 2021. 

 
 
 
 
From Nomads to Pilgrims:  Stories from Practicing Congregations. Alban Institute. 2006. With Joseph Stewart-Sicking
The Practicing Congregation: Imagining a New Old Church. Alban Institute. 2004.
Broken We Kneel:  Reflections on Faith and Citizenship. Jossey-Bass. 2004. 
Strength for the Journey: A Pilgrimage of Faith in Community. Jossey-Bass. 2002. 
Standing Against the Whirlwind:  Evangelical Episcopalians in Nineteenth-Century America. Oxford University Press. 1995. Published as "Diana Hochstedt Butler"

Notes

References

External links 
 

1959 births
20th-century American historians
20th-century American women writers
21st-century American Episcopalians
21st-century American historians
21st-century American women writers
Academics from Arizona
Academics from Maryland
American feminist writers
American historians of religion
American women historians
Anglican scholars
Converts to Anglicanism from Methodism
Duke University alumni
Episcopalians from Maryland
Former evangelicals
Former Methodists
Gordon–Conwell Theological Seminary alumni
Historians from Maryland
Historians of Christianity
Independent scholars
Living people
Proponents of Christian feminism
Rhodes College faculty
Westmont College alumni
Westmont College faculty
Writers from Baltimore
Writers from Scottsdale, Arizona